Brantz is a surname. Notable people with the surname include:

 Lewis Brantz ( 1768–1838), American merchant
 Loryn Brantz, American author and illustrator
 Stephanie Brantz (born 1972), Australian sports presenter

See also
 Brantz Mayer (1809–1879), American author, lawyer, and historian